Splice is a puzzle game developed by Philadelphia-based independent game studio Cipher Prime. Splice was released in 2012, and is available for PC, Mac, Linux, iPad, and Android. Splice is no longer available for download on Google Play.

Gameplay 
The player progresses through levels in Splice by rearranging groups of cells into target structures. The player has a limited number of moves (or "splices") to create each target structure; finishing a level in the fewest moves possible unlocks an "Angelic" achievement result.  Over the game's seventy-seven levels, the player will encounter power-up cells with special abilities (for instance, cells that destroy themselves and their children). The player must learn to use these increasingly complex cells to form increasingly complex target structures.

Soundtrack 
Splice'''s soundtrack was composed and recorded in-house by Cipher Prime co-founder Dain Saint. The soundtrack containing the music used in the first seven sequences of the game, Flight of Angels, and the soundtrack containing the music used in its epilogue, Algorithms and Angelology, are both available for download on Cipher Prime's website.

 Reception Splice'' received generally positive reviews, gaining an aggregate review score on Metacritic of 86 for iOS and Android.

References

External links 
 

2012 video games
Puzzle video games
Strategy video games
Windows games
MacOS games
Linux games
IOS games
Android (operating system) games
PlayStation 3 games
PlayStation 4 games
PlayStation Network games
Video games about evolution
Video games about genetic engineering
Video games about microbes
Video games developed in the United States